Derek James Neville Johnson (5 January 1933 – 30 August 2004) was a British track and field athlete.

Early life
Johnson was born in (East Ham) [London], and educated at East Ham Grammar School. He did his National Service in Egypt before going up to Lincoln College, Oxford, to read medicine in 1953. Whilst at Oxford.

Athletics career
He pursued an athletics career and represented England in the 1954 British Empire and Commonwealth Games in Vancouver, he won gold medals both in the 880 yards and the 4 x 440 yards relay.

Johnson went on to win a silver medal in the 1956 Melbourne Olympics, in the 800 metres and a bronze in the 4 x 400 metres relay.

In 1958 he won a silver medal in the 4 x 440 yards relay in the 1958 British Empire and Commonwealth Games in Cardiff.

He was a leading light in the setting up of the "athletes' union", the International Athletes' Club, he led opposition to Margaret Thatcher's call for sportsmen to boycott the 1980 Moscow Olympics.

Johnson competed for Woodford Green AC (now Woodford Green AC with Essex Ladies www.wgel.org.uk) where he was coached to his success by Ken Bone and was later awarded Life Membership. In the 1980s he also became a member of the Serpentine Running Club and ran several London Marathons. A great ally of David Bedford and a leading administrator in athletics.

References

1933 births
2004 deaths
Military personnel from Essex
20th-century British military personnel
People from Chigwell
English male sprinters
English male middle-distance runners
Olympic athletes of Great Britain
Athletes (track and field) at the 1956 Summer Olympics
Olympic bronze medallists for Great Britain
Athletes (track and field) at the 1954 British Empire and Commonwealth Games
Athletes (track and field) at the 1958 British Empire and Commonwealth Games
Commonwealth Games medallists in athletics
Commonwealth Games gold medallists for England
Commonwealth Games silver medallists for England
Alumni of Lincoln College, Oxford
Medalists at the 1956 Summer Olympics
Olympic silver medallists for Great Britain
Olympic silver medalists in athletics (track and field)
Olympic bronze medalists in athletics (track and field)
20th-century British people
Medallists at the 1954 British Empire and Commonwealth Games
Medallists at the 1958 British Empire and Commonwealth Games